Oceanihabitans is a genus of marine bacterium in the family Flavobacteriaceae. It contains a single species, O. sediminis. It is aerobic, Gram-negative, rod-shaped, and motile by gliding. O. sediminis produces flexirubin pigments. It is positive for cytochrome c oxidase and catalase. O. sediminis can use glucose, mannose, maltose and adipic acid as sole carbon sources for chemoheterotrophic growth. It is a chemoorganotroph and is chemotaxonomically characterized by the presence of menaquinone 6 (MK-6). The type strain is S9-10T.

Physiology 
O. sediminis is an aerobic microbe and is unable to grow under anaerobic or microaerophilic conditions. The major respiratory quinone is MK-6. It is cytochrome c oxidase and catalase positive. Oceanihabitans sediminis is capable of synthesizing a variety of hydrolytic enzymes including alkaline phosphatase, acid phosphatase, esterase lipase (C8), cysteine arylamidase, leucine arylamidase, valine arylamidase, naphthol-AS-Bi-phosphohydrolase, and chymotrypsin. A positive leucine arylamidase result indicates O. sediminis can hydrolyze proteins into oligopeptides or individual amino acids. The products of this reaction can serve as substrates for cell metabolism. A positive esterase lipase result indicates O. sediminis can break down emulsified mono-, di and triglycerides into glycerol and fatty acid residues.

Ecology
Members of the family Flavobacteriaceae are distributed globally. However, the abundance and diversity increases south of the polar front. O. sediminis strain S9-10T was isolated from a sediment sample in the northern Yellow Sea in China. The phosphatase activity of marine microorganisms plays a pivotal role in phosphorus and carbon biogeochemical cycles. Phosphatase-producing bacteria are capable of hydrolyzing specific dissolved organic phosphorus compounds. This supplies pools of phosphorus and carbon to heterotrophic and autotrophic microbes.

Physiology
O. sediminis is closely related to the genera Bizionia, Olleya, Lacinutrix, Algibacter, Winogradskyella,and Gaetbulibacter. Its DNA G+C content was 34.2 mol% which is consistent with other genera in the family Flavobacteriaceae.  The predominant cellular fatty acids are iso-C15:0 (21.1 %), iso- C15:1G (16.3 %) and iso-C17:0 3-OH (12.0 %). The polar lipids are phosphatidylethanolamine, aminophospholipid, aminoglycolipid, two unidentified amino-lipids, and five unidentified polar lipids.

References

Bacteria described in 2016
Flavobacteria
Monotypic bacteria genera
Bacteria genera